Lambdoceras is an extinct genus of Protoceratidae belonging to the order Artiodactyla (subfamily Synthetoceratinae) endemic to North America during the Miocene, living epoch 20.6—13.6 Ma, existing for approximately .

Taxonomy
A description of the genus Lambdoceras by Ruben A. Stirton was published in 1967. Its type is Lambdoceras hessei. It was synonymized subjectively with Prosynthetoceras by Patton (1969), Patton and Taylor (1971) and Patton and Taylor (1973). It was assigned to Protoceratidae by Stirton (1967), Tedford et al. (1987) and Albright (1999); and to Synthetoceratini by Webb (1981), Prothero (1998), Webb et al. (2003) and Prothero and Ludtke (2007).

References

Protoceratids
Miocene even-toed ungulates
Miocene mammals of North America
Fossil taxa described in 1967
Prehistoric even-toed ungulate genera